Thomas Tull (born June 9, 1970) is an American billionaire businessman, entrepreneur, and film producer. He is the former chairman and chief executive officer (CEO) of Legendary Entertainment. Tull is the founder of Tulco LLC, an investment holding company that uses artificial intelligence and other technologies to guide investing.

Early life and education
Tull grew up in Endwell, New York, the son of a dental hygienist single mother. As a youth, Tull was an athlete, playing baseball and football. Tull graduated from Hamilton College in 1992.

Career

Early career
After college, Tull abandoned plans to become a lawyer and instead went into business, starting a chain of laundromats. Among his innovations were different prices according to demand at different times of day. Tull next went into the field of financing, buying and selling several tax and accounting offices. He later became chief of operations of Tax Services of America. His business was buying units from franchisees of Jackson Hewitt Tax Services rolling up and consolidating operations. People who had established franchised locations often preferred being salaried managers. In 2001, Tull left Interactive Technology Funds to join the Convex Group, an Atlanta-based investment group. His firm invested in entertainment, where Tull began to learn the entertainment business. After discussing the potential of private equity with a film executive in 2003, Tull quit Convex, raising $600 million in equity to finance the production of movies under the Legendary Pictures banner.

Legendary Entertainment
Tull founded Legendary Entertainment in 2005, becoming the CEO and chairman. The company entered into a partnership in 2005 with Warner Bros. to jointly finance and produce films. In 2009, Tull became the majority shareholder of Legendary, in a buyout of the original investors. The Warner deal was followed by a similar deal with Universal Studios in 2013. He also helped produce the film Blackhat. Legendary was one of the first film production companies to use technology and data analytics to improve the way movies are marketed. Shortly after starting Legendary, Tull built a new analytics division within the company, which uses data to improve marketing decisions, in addition to other key decisions.

In January 2016, Legendary was acquired by the Wanda Cultural Industry Group for $3.5 billion, with Tull retaining a 20% stake. One year later, in January 2017, Tull left the company.

Tull describes himself as a "fanboy" of comics, and several of the films produced by Legendary were personal favorites of Tull, including Watchmen, 300, and Dark Knight. Watchmen had been in "development hell" for years when Tull arranged to pick up the rights. 300 had been turned down by other studios. Tull also describes himself as a "gamer", and co-founded the short-lived Brash Entertainment to work on film-to-video game conversions. Other major films include Inception, The Hangover and its sequels, Man of Steel, and others.

Tulco
In 2017, Tull founded Tulco, LLC, a Pittsburgh-based privately held holding company. Tulco invests in companies in large industries and helps its portfolio companies apply technology such as artificial intelligence, machine learning and predictive data analytics. Among Tulco’s investments are FIGS, a healthcare apparel company, and Acrisure, an insurance broker that acquired Tulco’s AI insurance business in July 2020 for $400 million.

Other investments
Tull has also invested in a variety of other AI and data science-driven companies including Luvos, Genies, Oculus, and Zoox.

Philanthropy and board membership
Tull has donated US$1 million to Priorities USA Action, a Super PAC supporting Democratic presidential candidate Hillary Clinton. Tull has also supported Republican causes, such as the Senate Leadership Fund, a super PAC for Senate Republicans. He founded the Tull Family Foundation, which has supported a number of causes in the youth, health, and education spaces including the National Little League, a donation of $4.2 million worth of personal protective equipment (PPE) during the COVID-19 pandemic, a donation to the Children's Hospital of Pittsburgh Foundation towards pediatric research and art therapy programs, and a grant to the University of Pittsburgh towards brain cancer research.

He is a member of MIT School of Engineering Dean’s Advisory Council, the board of trustees of Carnegie Mellon University, Yellowstone Forever, and the Baseball Hall of Fame Board of Directors. Tull was appointed a visiting scholar of innovation at the MIT School of Engineering beginning April 1, 2022.

Personal life
He resides in Pittsburgh, Pennsylvania with his wife and their children. They previously lived in Thousand Oaks, California.  In January 2018, the 33-plus-acre Thousand Oaks compound was listed for $85 million.

Tull has been a fan of the Pittsburgh Steelers since age four and in 2009 became a part-owner of the team. He is a founder and member of the American rock and southern soul band Ghost Hounds, in which he plays guitar.

Filmography

Film

As an actor

Television

As an actor

References

External links

 

1970 births
Living people
People from Broome County, New York
Carnegie Mellon University trustees
American film producers
American billionaires